On 8 February 1956 the Royal Air Force lost six Hawker Hunter jet fighters in a multiple aircraft accident. Upon completion of the exercise, the eight Hunters diverted to RAF Marham, but due to bad weather, six of the aircraft were lost, including one fatality.

Accident
Due to the expected bad weather later in the day the aircraft were scheduled to return to West Raynham overhead by 11:15. By 11:00 the weather at West Raynham had deteriorated with poor visibility and the aircraft were told to divert to nearby RAF Marham for a visual approach. 

The visibility suddenly reduced but due to the close proximity of the aircraft to each other it was not possible to complete ground controlled approaches. In the following confusion and with only 10 minutes of fuel remaining, only two aircraft landed successfully.

WT629
WT639
The pilot ejected when the engine flamed out.
WW633
The pilot ejected when the engine flamed out.
WW639
The pilot ejected when fuel was exhausted.
WW635
WW603
Belly-landed following engine flame-out just east of the airfield, pilot unhurt.

Aftermath
Questions were asked in Parliament about the loss of six aircraft worth about £750,000  and the suspicion - expressed by the Labour MP George Wigg - that "Marks I and II are liable to be deficient in fuel if a crisis arises".  Concern was also raised about the carrying out of the exercise in the expected weather conditions.

Investigation
The Board of Inquiry (BoI) reported that the primary cause of the accident was the sudden deterioration in the weather. The board also said it was an error of judgement to divert the aircraft to Marham on the assumption that they could do a visual landing.

The BoI stated that the decision to fly in the weather conditions was proper and reasonable, the pilots were all competent, the aircraft were serviceable and had adequate fuel and endurance for the planned mission.

The Air Officer Commanding-in-Chief Fighter Command decided that disciplinary action should be taken against officers in charge of flying operations at West Raynham. One officer was reproved and removed from his job and three other officers were reproved.

References

Aviation accidents and incidents in 1956
Aviation accidents and incidents in Norfolk
Accidents and incidents involving Royal Air Force aircraft
1956 in England
February 1956 events in the United Kingdom